Takiyuddin bin Haji Hassan (Jawi: تقي الدين بن حاج حسن; born 24 November 1961) is a Malaysian politician from the Malaysian Islamic Party (PAS), a component party of the Perikatan Nasional (PN) coalition who has served as the Member of Parliament (MP) for Kota Bharu since May 2013. He served as the Minister of Energy and Natural Resources in the Barisan Nasional (BN) administration under former Prime Minister Ismail Sabri Yaakob from August 2021 to the collapse of the BN administration in November 2022, the Minister in the Prime Minister's Department in charge of Parliament and Law in the PN administration under Prime Minister Muhyiddin Yassin from March 2020 to the collapse of the PN administration in August 2021. In addition, he has served as the Secretary-General of PAS since June 2015 and Chief Whip of PN and PAS in the Dewan Rakyat and the only member of the Public Accounts Committee from PAS.

Education
Takiyuddin graduated from the University of Malaya with a Bachelor of Laws (LL.B.) (Hons).

Election results

Honours
  :
  Knight Commander of the Order of the Life of the Crown of Kelantan (DJMK) – Dato' (2007)
  Knight Grand Commander of the Order of the Life of the Crown of Kelantan (SJMK) – Dato' (2018)
  :
  Grand Commander of the Order of the Territorial Crown (SMW) – Datuk Seri (2021)

See also
 Kota Bharu (federal constituency)

References

Living people
1961 births
People from Kedah
Malaysian people of Malay descent
Malaysian Muslims
Malaysian Islamic Party politicians
Members of the Dewan Rakyat
Members of the Kelantan State Legislative Assembly
University of Malaya alumni
21st-century Malaysian politicians